Howard Huntley Shannon, CMG, (29 March 1892 – 15 August 1976) served as a member of the South Australian House of Assembly for the Electoral district of Murray from 8 April 1933 to 18 March 1938 and for the Electoral district of Onkaparinga from 19 March 1938 to 1 March 1968. In 1960, Shannon was made a Companion of the Order of St Michael and St George for his service as a member of the House of Assembly.

References

Members of the South Australian House of Assembly
1892 births
1976 deaths
Liberal and Country League politicians
20th-century Australian politicians
Australian Companions of the Order of St Michael and St George